The 46th Baeksang Arts Awards ceremony was held at Hae Main Hall of the National Theater of Korea in Seoul on March 26, 2010. It was presented by IS Plus Corp. and broadcast on KBS2. TV presenter Lee Hwi-jae and actress Kim Ah-joong hosted the ceremony.

Nominations and winners
Complete list of nominees and winners:

(Winners denoted in bold)

Film

Television

Other awards
 InStyle Fashionista Award – Son Ye-jin
 Lifetime Achievement Award – Bae Sam-ryong

References

External links
 

Baeksang
Baeksang
Baeksang Arts Awards
Baek
Baek
2010 in South Korea
2010s in Seoul